This list of historical markers installed by the National Historical Commission of the Philippines (NHCP) outside the Philippines is an annotated list of people, places, or events in the region that have been commemorated by cast-iron plaques issued by the said commission. The plaques themselves are permanent signs installed in publicly visible locations on buildings, monuments, or in special locations. Many markers outside the country have been written in the local languages such as French, German, and Spanish.

The Kudan, the Philippine embassy building in Tokyo, has been declared a national historical landmark by the NHCP and was granted a historical marker on March 3, 2014. It is the first and currently the only overseas site to be granted such status. During the unveiling of the marker, Ambassador Manuel Lopez called the building as the crown jewel of Philippine foreign service.

This article lists thirty-eight (38) markers outside the Philippines.

Overseas markers

See also
List of historical markers of the Philippines

References

Footnotes

Bibliography 

A list of sites and structures with historical markers, as of 16 January 2012
A list of institutions with historical markers, as of 16 January 2012

External links

A list of sites and structures with historical markers, as of 16 January 2012
A list of institutions with historical markers, as of 16 January 2012
National Registry of Historic Sites and Structures in the Philippines
Policies on the Installation of Historical Markers

Overseas